Bill Morgan may refer to:
Bill Morgan (producer) (1940–2020), CBC television producer
Bill Morgan (archivist), associated with the Beat literary movement
Bill Morgan (outfielder/catcher) (1857–1938), baseball player for the Pittsburgh Alleghenys, Richmond Virginians and Baltimore Monumentals
Bill Morgan (outfielder/shortstop) (1856–1908), baseball player for the Pittsburgh Alleghenys and Washington Nationals
Bill Morgan (American football) (1910–1985), American football player
Bill Morgan (judoka), Canadian judoka and three-time Paralympian
Bill Morgan (rugby), Welsh rugby union and rugby league footballer of the 1920s and 1930s

See also
William Morgan (disambiguation)
Billy Morgan (disambiguation)